The R. J. Neutra Elementary School is an elementary school on the Naval Air Station Lemoore Base located in the San Joaquin Valley, in Lemoore Station, Kings County, California.

Design
The school was built in 1960 from an earlier 1929 International style architectural design created by modernist architect Richard Neutra. It is a large single round "donut" structure radiating around a spacious open courtyard. The school's website describes it with: "Here one finds a "Civilian Island" of eleven acres in the midst of a military complex."

School
The R. J. Neutra Elementary School, grades K-5th, is within the Central Union School District.

School administrators created and buried a time capsule in 1993 to be opened "20 Years Later" in 2013.

School Activities 
R. J. Neutra offers programs such as "Gifted and Talented" and "Mileage Club" and other scholastic groups, basketball, volleyball, track and field, and other sports teams.

Neutra Elementary School has currently won 3 California Distinguished Schools Awards and 2 National Blue Ribbon Schools Awards.

References

External links
 Official website

Richard Neutra buildings
Modernist architecture in California
International style architecture in California
San Joaquin Valley
Schools in Kings County, California
School buildings completed in 1960
Public elementary schools in California
Educational institutions established in 1960
1960 establishments in California